Vasilis Cornelius Barkas (born 30 May 1994) is a Greek international football player who plays as a goalkeeper for Eredivisie club Utrecht, on loan from Scottish Premiership side Celtic, and the Greece national team.

Early life
Barkas was born in Athens to a Greek father and Dutch mother.

Club career

Atromitos
Barkas started football in 2006 when he signed in the academies Atromitos. In 2013 he was promoted to the men's team and signed a professional contract with the club of Peristeri. He made his debut on 20 May 2015 against PAOK, replacing Andrey Harbunow at the 83rd minute. The 2015–16 season did not start well for him as he was the back-up goalkeeper. On 30 January 2016 he started as regular against PAOK making an excellent appearance. After that, he became the first-choice goalkeeper of the club. In the summer of 2016, Aston Villa, Olympiacos, PAOK and AEK Athens were interested in signing Barkas. On 9 June 2016, he signed for AEK for a fee of €600,000. The officials of AEK decided to not complete the transfer of Georgian international goalkeeper Giorgi Loria and start the 2016–17 season with Giannis Anestis and Barkas.

AEK Athens
On 27 November Barkas made his debut for the club in a 3–0 home win against Platanias. On 20 July 2017, Barkas suffered a serious injury during training, when he broke the thumb of his right hand. He was expected to remain out of action for three months, missing the upcoming 2017–18 UEFA Champions League qualifiers against CSKA Moscow, where Anestis was expected to take his place. On 29 November he recovered from his injury taking his place in the team as a starter in a 3–2 away Greek Cup win against Kallithea, after Anestis was frozen out and shared goalkeeping duties with Panagiotis Tsintotas in the Super League while participating in all knockout cup fixtures.

On 7 June 2018, Barkas agreed to a contract extension with AEK, until the summer of 2022. On 22 June, the administration of the team rejected a €6,000,000 offer from Udinese, asking for a minimum fee of €10,000,000. After returning from injury, Barkas' form was a highlight for AEK and he made some very impressive saves in the qualifiers against Celtic and MOL Vidi in the UEFA Champions League preliminary rounds. During his 2018–19 season, Barkas made 41 appearances across all competitions, conceding 34 goals and tallying 22 clean sheets, his best season so far.

On 10 August 2019, Montpellier made two official offers for the Greek international, but AEK rejected both of them, setting a price tag of €8,000,000. In the 2019–20 season, he registered 10 clean sheets in 20 games of the domestic championship, helping AEK recover from a poor start to the campaign.

Celtic
Barkas signed for Scottish Premiership club Celtic in July 2020 on a four-year contract for a £5,000,000 fee plus future incentives. He made his debut on 9 August against Kilmarnock, replacing Scott Bain, after Celtic's coach Neil Lennon confirmed that he had been training well. On 25 October, Barkas was dropped out of the starting XI, after back-to-back defeats against Rangers and AC Milan, with Bain starting in his place in the 3–3 draw away to Aberdeen. Thereafter, he was soon dropped from the league squad.

During the 2021–22 season, Barkas appeared to become the No.1 under new boss Ange Postecoglou. But poor performances against FC Midtjylland and West Ham resulted in Scott Bain taking the gloves for the Champions League. Joe Hart's arrival pushed Barkas out of the squad. It was expected that Barkas would leave the club in a loan deal, but the summer window closed before a deal could be agreed. On 26 December 2021, with both Joe Hart and Scott Bain unavailable, Barkas made his first appearance in the Premiership of the 2021–22 season.

Loan to Utrecht
On 7 July 2022, Barkas moved on loan to Utrecht.

International career
Barkas played for Greece at under-19 and under-21 level, making six appearances for the U19s and eight for the U21s. Οn 4 June 2016, he was called by Michael Skibbe into the Greece national team after Orestis Karnezis was injured for the friendlies against Australia. On 16 March 2018, he was called up by Greece for the friendlies against Switzerland and Egypt in March 2018. On 27 March, he made his debut against Egypt as a second-half substitute.

Career statistics

Club

International

Honours
AEK Athens
Super League Greece: 2017–18
Greek Cup runner-up: 2016–17, 2017–18, 2018–19

Celtic
Scottish Premiership: 2021–22
Scottish Cup: 2019–20

References

External links
Profile at the Celtic F.C. website
Profile at the Hellenic Football Federation website 

1994 births
Living people
People from Overbetuwe
Footballers from Gelderland
Association football goalkeepers
Atromitos F.C. players
AEK Athens F.C. players
Celtic F.C. players
FC Utrecht players
Super League Greece players
Scottish Professional Football League players
Greece youth international footballers
Greece under-21 international footballers
Greece international footballers
Greek expatriate footballers
Expatriate footballers in Scotland
Greek expatriate sportspeople in Scotland
Dutch people of Greek descent
Footballers from Athens
Greek footballers